This is a list of diplomatic missions of Mexico, excluding honorary consulates. Mexico's foreign service started in 1822, the year after the signing of the Treaty of Cordoba which marked the beginning of Mexico's independence. In 1831, legislation was passed that underpinned the establishment of diplomatic representations with other states in Europe and the Americas. As of 2022, Mexico has diplomatic relations with 193 countries.

Today, Mexico has a significant worldwide presence, with over 150 representations, including 52 consulates in the United States alone (no other country has as many consulates in any single host country).

Current missions

Africa

Americas

Asia

Europe

Oceania

Multilateral organizations

Gallery

Diplomatic missions to open
  
 Dhaka (Embassy)
 
 Chongqing (Consulate)
  
 Abidjan (Embassy)
  
 Astana (Embassy)
  
 Islamabad (Embassy)
  
 Dakar (Embassy)

Closed missions

Africa

Americas

Asia

Europe

Oceania

See also
 Foreign relations of Mexico
 List of diplomatic missions in Mexico
 Visa policy of Mexico

Notes

References

External links

 Ministry of Foreign Relations of Mexico

 
Mexico
Diplomatic missions